In enzymology, a 1,2-dehydroreticulinium reductase (NADPH) is an enzyme that catalyzes the chemical reaction

(R)-reticuline + NADP  1,2-dehydroreticulinium + NADPH + H

Thus, the two substrates of this enzyme are (R)-reticuline and NADP, whereas its 3 products are 1,2-dehydroreticulinium, NADPH, and H.

This enzyme belongs to the family of oxidoreductases, specifically those acting on the CH-NH group of donors with NAD+ or NADP+ as acceptor.  The systematic name of this enzyme class is (R)-reticuline:NADP+ oxidoreductase. This enzyme is also called 1,2-dehydroreticulinium ion reductase.  This enzyme participates in alkaloid biosynthesis i.

References

 

EC 1.5.1
NADPH-dependent enzymes
Enzymes of unknown structure